The Yosemite Short Line Railway was a  narrow gauge railway constructed in the Yosemite region of California. Construction commenced in 1905 but construction was abandoned due to the financial crisis caused by the 1906 San Francisco earthquake, with only 8.5 miles (14 km) constructed. The railway was abandoned by 1917. Locomotive power was provided by two Porter 0-4-0T steam locomotives.

References

Further reading 
 Elg, Lennart. The Yosemite Short Line Railway Co. Undated. 
 Francis, Mark Steven. Yosemite Short Line Railroad Company. A Fresh Look Undated, but cites a source from 2006.

2 ft 6 in gauge railways in the United States
Defunct California railroads
Narrow gauge railroads in California
Yosemite National Park